Juan Ignacio Quintana . (Nacido el 5 de abril de 1999) es un fútbolista argentino que juega como defensor actualmente en club atlético Paraná

References

2000 births
Living people
Club Atlético River Plate (Montevideo) players
Uruguayan footballers
Association football midfielders